Arzu Karabulut (born 30 January 1991) is a German-born Turkish footballer who plays as a midfielder in the Turkish Women's Football Super League for ALG Spor with jersey number 38, and the Turkey women's national team.

Personal life
Arzu Karabulut was born on 30 January 1991 in Cologne to Turkish parents Esef and Kevser, who immigrated to Germany in 1977. She has three older brothers.

She became interested in playing football early in her childhood and, at the age of four, joined her three brothers who were in football already. She was supported by her parents, who told her, however, the education must always have priority. At the age of fourteen, she was called up for training in the Turkey women's under 19 national team, as there was no U-17 national team in Turkey at the time; German Football Association coach Bettina Wiegmann had her sights on her as well, but she chose the national team of her parents' native country.

After completing her secondary education with a "Fachabitur", she began a two-year trainee program, which will last until 2014, as a tax expert assistant in her brother Irfan's office.

Arzu Karabulut admits that she is a great fan of Lionel Messi. She said in a newspaper interview that she even straightens her curly hair for her admiration.

Club career 

Karabulu entered SC Fortuna Köln at the age of ten, and ran through the youth teams. She played from 2007 to 2010 in the Cologne-based club, competing in the Regionalliga. In the summer of 2010, she transferred to Bayer 04 Leverkusen II, a rival team in the league. She is a regular team member since then.

She made her debut in the Frauen-Bundesliga playing in the first team of her club in the match against FF USV Jena on 27 November 2011.

In July 2014, she transferred from Bayer 04 Leverkusen II in Germany, where she scored 26 goals in 52 games of the last three seasons, to Konak Belediyespor in Izmir, Turkey.

Arzu Karabulut transferred to Trabzon İdmanocağı after playing nine games and scoring two goals in the 2014–15 season with Konak Belediyespor. She scored already seven goals in the first match of the league's 2015–16 season, which ended 19–0 for her new team. She finished the 2015–16 season as "Top scorer" with 23 goals netted in 17 league matches.

By October 2017, she transferred to the Istanbul-based club Ataşehir Belediyespor.

In the 2018–19 league season, she transferred to Beşiktaş J.K. She enjoyed the champion title of her team in the 2018–19 season. She took part at the 2019–20 UEFA Women's Champions League - Group 9 matches.

Karabulut returned to her former club SC Fortuna Köln in her birthplace Cologne, Germany on 9 October 2020.

She went to Turkey again, and joined Beşiktaş J.K. in the 2020-21 Turkcell Women's Football League season.  She enjoyed her team's champions title, and played in two matches of the 2021–22 UEFA Women's Champions League qualifying rounds scoring one goal. In October 2021, she suffered a nasal fracture during a friendly match before the 2021-22 Turkcell Super League, and had to underwent an operation.

On 23 July 2022, she transferred to the Gaziantep-based league champion club ALG Spor. She played for her new team in the 2022–23 UEFA Women's Champions League on 18 August 2022.

International career 

Between 2006 and 2007, Karabulut capped eleven times for the Turkey girls' under 17 national team, amongst others in the qualifications for the 2008 UEFA Women's U-17 Championship. She scored three goals with the Turkey U-17 national team, all in friendly matches.

Already in the beginning of 2006, she debuted in the Turkey women's U-19 national team. Karabulut went on to appear in 39 international matches until 2010, and netted seven goals for the U-19 national team.

Finally, she made her debut in the Turkey women's national team in the UEFA Women's Euro 2013 qualifying – Group 2 match against the Romanian side on 23 November 2011. She took part in the 2015 FIFA Women's World Cup qualification – UEFA Group 6 match first time against Montenegro on 28 November 2013. She scored her team's honor goal in the match against the women from Wales that ended with 1–5.

Career statistics 
.

Honours

Individual 
 Top scorer (1): 2015–16 (23 goals)

Club 
 Turkish Women's First League
 Konak Belediyespor
 Winners (1): 2014–15

 Trabzon idmanocağı
 Third places (1): 2015–16

 Ataşehir Belediyespor
 Winners (1): 2017–18

 Beşiktaş J.K.
 Winners (2): 2018–19, 2020–21

References

External links 
 

1991 births
Living people
Citizens of Turkey through descent
Turkish women's footballers
Women's association football midfielders
Konak Belediyespor players
Trabzon İdmanocağı women's players
Ataşehir Belediyespor players
Beşiktaş J.K. women's football players
Turkish Women's Football Super League players
Turkey women's international footballers
Footballers from Cologne
German women's footballers
SC Fortuna Köln players
Bayer 04 Leverkusen (women) players
German people of Turkish descent
ALG Spor players